Magix (or MAGIX Software) is a German software company specializing in video editing, audio editing, DAW and photo slideshow software. The company is based in Berlin, with locations in Madison, Wisconsin, Dresden and Lübbecke, as well as Huizen in the Netherlands.

In May 2018, private equity firm Capiton announced that it had acquired a majority stake in Magix Software GmbH together with its management.

Product history 

In 1994, the first edition of Magix Music Maker was released, that has now become one of the most widely used music making software globally with over 2 million users. Starting in 1996, the Magix product range was extended to include software for designing, editing, presenting and archiving photos and videos. Magix products and services were first offered in other European countries and the USA starting in 1997.

In 1997, the first video editing software by the company, Magix Movie Edit Pro (also known as "Magix Video Deluxe" in Europe) was released in 1997, and today ranks among world's best software for semi-professional and DIY users. Soon after in 2002, the first version of Magix Photos on CD & DVD (now known as "Magix Photostory Deluxe") was released - ranked as world's best software in 2018 by TopTenreviews  for creating photo slideshow.

In November 2008, Magix launched the knowledge community magix.info as an independent community for experts on the topics of video editing, music production and photo editing.

In May 2016, Magix acquired Vegas Pro, Movie Studio, Sound Forge and ACID Pro from the Sony Creative Software product range.

Magix also released software for VR video editing (including a free VR player app ) and Android mobile apps (Camera MX, Acid Beatbox, Looply for music, video editing and animation for younger audience.

Product Overview

Management Team  
 Denis Burger (CEO) 
 Jan Gackenholz (CFO & COO) 
 Hagen Hirche (CTO)

References 

Software companies of Germany
German companies established in 1994